The Sphaerolichida is a suborder of mites belonging to the order Trombidiformes.

References 

O'Connor, 1984 :  1. Speciation and evolution in Acari. 1.2 Phylogenetic relationships among higher taxa in the Acariformes, with particular reference to the Astigmata. In Acarology 6, Vol. 1. Griffiths & Bowman pp 19–27.

External links 

Trombidiformes
Arthropod suborders